Moitessier is a French surname. Notable people with the surname include:

 Bernard Moitessier (1925–1994), French sailor
 Madame Moitessier

French-language surnames